Kevin Mirocha (born 7 October 1991 in Hamm, Germany) is a Polish-German racing driver.

Early life
During childhood, Mirocha raced karts in Koszalin, Poland.

Career

Formula BMW
Despite beginning his karting career in 2001, 2007 saw his debut in the Formula BMW ADAC championship with ADAC Berlin-Brandenburg. Mirocha finished 8th in the championship and third in the Rookie Cup with one podium at EuroSpeedway Lausitz.

Formula Three
In 2008, Mirocha stepped up to the ATS Formel 3 Cup with Josef Kaufmann Racing. He finished sixth in the standings after taking four podium places. Mirocha moved to HBR Motorsport and the Formula 3 Euro Series in 2009 but left the series pointless, after failing to start either race at the Zandvoort round.

Formula Renault
Mirocha competed in seven of the twenty races that comprised the 2010 Formula Renault 2.0 NEC season for the SL Formula Racing team, winning the final race of the season at the Nürburgring. He finished ninth in the championship, the third best-placed driver who did not contest all the rounds of the championship.

GP2 Series
Mirocha moved up to the GP2 Series with the Ocean Racing Technology team for 2011, driving alongside Johnny Cecotto Jr. He did not start either race at Silverstone after injuring his left shoulder. After fourteen races, he was replaced by Brendon Hartley. Despite this, he finished the season 22nd in the drivers' championship, the highest-placed of those not to score any points.

FIA Formula 2
In 2012 Mirocha competed in FIA Formula 2.  He had a strong rookie season, and took his maiden Formula 2 victory at Brands Hatch.

Racing record

Career summary

Complete Formula 3 Euro Series results
(key)

Complete GP2 Series results
(key) (Races in bold indicate pole position) (Races in italics indicate fastest lap)

Complete FIA Formula Two Championship results
(key) (Races in bold indicate pole position) (Races in italics indicate fastest lap)

References

External links

1991 births
Living people
Sportspeople from Hamm
Racing drivers from North Rhine-Westphalia
German racing drivers
Polish racing drivers
Formula BMW ADAC drivers
German Formula Three Championship drivers
Formula 3 Euro Series drivers
GP2 Series drivers
FIA Formula Two Championship drivers
Formula Renault 2.0 NEC drivers
German people of Polish descent
Ocean Racing Technology drivers
Mücke Motorsport drivers
Josef Kaufmann Racing drivers